Landkreditt is a Norwegian cooperative financial group established in 1915.

The group consists of Landkreditt Bank, Landkreditt Forvaltning, Landkreditt Finans, Landkreditt Boligkreditt, Landkreditt Invest and Landkredittgården. Landkreditt Bank opened in 2002 as a self-service internet bank, with focus on both private- and businessmarket. Most of the business customers are part of the primary industry. The banks total assets is approximately 15,2 billion NOK.

References

External links
 Landkreditt Bank

Banks of Norway
1915 establishments in Norway